is a song by Japanese rock band Godiego, serving as their 8th single. It is internationally known as the opening theme for the 1978 television series , known in the west as Monkey. The song peaked at #2 on the Oricon Charts and #4 on The Best Ten.

Track list
Japanese single track listing
 "Monkey Magic"
 "A Fool"
British single track listing
 "Monkey Magic"
 "Gandhara"
 The first verse is Japanese, the second verse is English
 "Thank You, Baby"
Australian single track listing
 "The Birth of the Odyssey ~ Monkey Magic"
 "Gandhara"

Cover versions
Soko released a cover version in 1999

A cover version of "Monkey Magic" by Orange Range was featured in the Nintendo DS video game, Moero! Nekketsu Rhythm Damashii Osu! Tatakae! Ouendan 2. Animetal made their version on Animetal Marathon VII album. Another cover was featured in Lucky Star. Godiego released their own self cover on the single "Monkey Magic 2006". Also AAA made one for their cover album "CCC-CHALLENGE COVER COLLECTION-". The Japanese-Canadian pop group Monkey Majik (which took their name from the song) released a new cover version in 2007.

Korean pop singer E-Paksa performed a cover for a compilation of his unique variety of "ponchak" music, which was one featured on the Korean dance simulation game Pump it Up.

References

External links 
 

1978 singles
English-language Japanese songs
Godiego songs
Japanese television drama theme songs
1978 songs
Songs written by Yukihide Takekawa
Songs written by Yoko Narahashi
Nippon Columbia singles
Songs about primates